The 1912 Invercargill mayoral election was held on 25 April 1912 as part of that year's local elections.

Two-time former mayor William Benjamin Scandrett was elected once again. His opponent, Andrew Bain, would first become mayor in 1923.

Results
The following table gives the election results:

References

1912 elections in New Zealand
Mayoral elections in Invercargill